The Hebrew Standard was "An English language weekly newspaper published in New York City in the early 20th Century" (and the late 19th century). They editorialized against intermarriage. The matter of Jewish Sabbath observance
and Sunday Blue Laws was another of the areas in which they advocated.

The newspaper wrote about celebrating days of importance on the Jewish calendar, and covered Jewish community news (locally, USA-wide, and beyond).

See also
 The Jewish Daily Forward (in English)
 The Jewish Standard

References

Defunct newspapers published in New York City
Jewish newspapers published in the United States
Jewish-American history